Macau is an autonomous territory on the western side of the Pearl River Delta in East Asia.

Macau is among the world's richest regions, and  its GDP per capita by purchasing power parity is higher than that of any country in the world, according to the World Bank. It became the world's largest gambling centre in 2006, with the economy heavily dependent on gambling and tourism, as well as manufacturing. According to The World Factbook, Macau has the fourth highest life expectancy in the world. Moreover, it is one of the regions in Asia with a "very high Human Development Index", ranking 18th in the world .

Notable firms 
This list includes notable companies with primary headquarters located in the country. The industry and sector follow the Industry Classification Benchmark taxonomy. Organizations which have ceased operations are included and noted as defunct.

See also 
 Economy of Macau
 List of banks in Macau

References 

 
 Macau
Companies

Companies
Macau